The 1998 Women's Home Nations Championship was the third and final Women's Home Nations Championship and was won by Scotland, who achieved the Triple Crown. In order to complete a Grand Slam, Scotland also defeated France outside of the competition.

Final table

Results

See also
Women's Six Nations Championship
Women's international rugby union

References

External links
The official RBS Six Nations Site

1998
1998 rugby union tournaments for national teams
1997–98 in Irish rugby union
1997–98 in English rugby union
1997–98 in Welsh rugby union
1997–98 in Scottish rugby union
rugby union
rugby union
1997–98 in European women's rugby union
rugby union
rugby union
Women's Home Nations
Women's Home Nations
Women's Home Nations